Pete Caringi may refer to:

Pete Caringi Jr. (born c. 1955), American soccer coach
Pete Caringi III (born 1992), American soccer player